Pan Men-an (born 15 August 1963) is a Taiwanese politician. He has been the Magistrate of Pingtung County since 25 December 2014.

Early life
Pan was born to a fishermen's family.

Education
Pan graduated from the graduate institute of continuing education of National Kaohsiung Normal University.

Career life

Pingtung County Council
Pan became the member of Pingtung County Council on 1 March 1998 and served two terms until 28 February 2006.

Legislative Yuan
Pan was elected as the member of Legislative Yuan after the 2004 Republic of China legislative election held on 11 December 2004 and served from 1 February 2005 until 31 January 2008.

Pan was elected again as the member representing the Democratic Progressive Party for Pingtung County 3rd electoral district after winning the 2008 Republic of China legislative election held on 12 January 2008 and served from 1 February 2008 until 31 January 2012.

He was reelected again to the office after winning the 2012 Republic of China legislative election held on 14 January 2012 and served from 1 February 2012 until 25 December 2014.

Magistrate of Pingtung County

2014 Pingtung County magistrate election
Pan was elected as the Magistrate of Pingtung County after winning the 2014 Pingtung County magistrate election held on 29 November 2014.

2018 Pingtung County magistrate election

References

External links

 

1963 births
Living people
Members of the 8th Legislative Yuan
Magistrates of Pingtung County
Democratic Progressive Party Members of the Legislative Yuan
Members of the 7th Legislative Yuan
National Kaohsiung Normal University alumni